Benjamin Byas (born 1842) was a member of the South Carolina House of Representatives during the Reconstruction era. He represented Orangeburg County in the state house from 1870 to 1872.

Born in the West Indies, he represented Berkeley County at the 1868 South Carolina Constitutional Convention. He was one of four "colored" delegates from the county. 

In the South Carolina House of Representatives advocated strongly that educational institutions receiving public funds should open to all "regardless of race or color". He opposed compulsory education.

References

Members of the South Carolina House of Representatives
1842 births
Year of death missing